I Promise may refer to:

"I Promise" (Stacie Orrico song), a 2004 song by Stacie Orrico
"I Promise" (Radiohead song), a 2017 song by Radiohead
"I Promise", a song by Royce da 5'9" from his 2004 album Death Is Certain
I Promise (album), a 2006 album by Jin
I Promise (film), a 1994 Austrian drama film
I Promise School, an  elementary school in Akron, Ohio
I Promise, a 2020 television series on Quibi

See also 
 A Promise (disambiguation)
 Promise (disambiguation)
 The Promise (disambiguation)